Neveklov is a town in Benešov District in the Central Bohemian Region of the Czech Republic. It has about 2,700 inhabitants.

Administrative parts
Villages and hamlets of Bělice, Blažim, Borovka, Chvojínek, Dalešice, Doloplazy, Dubovka, Heroutice, Hůrka Kapinos, Jablonná, Kožlí, Lipka, Mlékovice, Nebřich, Neštětice, Neveklov, Ouštice, Přibyšice, Radslavice, Spolí, Tloskov, Zádolí and Zárybnice are administrative parts of Neveklov.

Geography
It lies in a hilly landscape of the Benešov Uplands. The municipal territory is rich on ponds, the largest of them is Panský. The eastern border of the vast territory is formed by Slapy Reservoir.

History
The first written mention of Neveklov is from 1285. The village was promoted to a town by King Ferdinand I in 1563.

Sights
The Church of Saint Gall is an early Gothic church with Renaissance and Baroque modifications.

The fortress in Tloskov was first documented in 1376. During the rule of the Hodějovský family between 1574 and 1620, it was rebuilt into a castle. In the mid-18th century, Tloskov Castle was baroque rebuilt, extended and the castle park was established. In the first half of the 19th century, the castle was completely rebuilt in the late Neoclassical style. Today is houses an institute of social care.

On Neštětická hora Hill is an eponymous observation tower. It has an asymmetrical shape and was built in 1927.

Notable people
Arnošt Konstantin Růžička (1761–1845), Bishop of České Budějovice

References

External links

Cities and towns in the Czech Republic
Populated places in Benešov District